Noah Glass is an American technology entrepreneur and software developer, whose early work included launching Twitter and Odeo, a podcasting company that closed in 2017. Glass is credited for coining the name "Twitter", which began as "Twttr".

Career
After leaving Industrial Light & Magic, Glass worked on several projects with Marc Canter, founder of MacroMind which later became Macromedia, birthplace of the Shockwave multimedia platform.

He later developed an app that allowed a user to enter an audio blog entry from a remote cell phone location. His small start-up, known as AudBlog, was eventually folded into a partnership with Evan Williams, of Blogger. The duo then created Odeo, a podcasting company.

In 2006, while with Odeo, Glass helped to create and develop the seed idea for what would eventually become known as Twitter. Not only was he the prime motivating force leading to its eventual development, Glass is acknowledged as being responsible for coining the name "Twitter", which began as the abbreviated version, "Twttr". In the book, Hatching Twitter, by Nick Bilton, Glass is given credit as being a Twitter co-founder, having helped realize the idea, and designing some of its core features.

References

External links
 

American businesspeople
Living people
Twitter, Inc. people
Place of birth missing (living people)
Year of birth missing (living people)
Web developers
Computer programmers
American computer programmers